Oku no Hosomichi (originally ), translated as The Narrow Road to the Deep North and The Narrow Road to the Interior, is a major work of haibun by the Japanese poet Matsuo Bashō, considered one of the major texts of Japanese literature of the Edo period.
The first edition was published posthumously in 1702.

The text is written in the form of a prose and verse travel diary and was penned as Bashō made an epic and dangerous journey on foot through the Edo Japan of the late 17th century. While the poetic work became seminal of its own account, the poet's travels in the text have since inspired many people to follow in his footsteps and trace his journey for themselves. In one of its most memorable passages, Bashō suggests that "every day is a journey, and the journey itself home".  The text was also influenced by the works of Du Fu, who was highly revered by Bashō.

Of Oku no Hosomichi, Kenji Miyazawa once suggested, "It was as if the very soul of Japan had itself written it."

The text

Opening sentences
Bashō's introductory sentences are the most quoted of Oku no Hosomichi:

Plot

Oku no Hosomichi was written based on a journey taken by Bashō in the late spring of 1689. He and his traveling companion Kawai Sora (河合曾良) departed from Edo (modern-day Tokyo) for the northerly interior region known as Oku, propelled mostly by a desire to see the places about which the old poets wrote in an effort to "renew his own art." Specifically, he was emulating Saigyō, whom Bashō praised as the greatest waka poet; Bashō made a point of visiting all the sites mentioned in Saigyō's verse. Travel in those days was very dangerous, but Bashō was committed to a kind of poetic ideal of wandering. He traveled for about 156 days altogether, covering almost , mostly on foot. Of all of Bashō's works, this is the best known.

This poetic diary is in the form known as haibun, a combination of prose and haiku. It contains many references to Confucius, Saigyō, Du Fu, ancient Chinese poetry, and even The Tale of the Heike. It manages to strike a delicate balance between all the elements to produce a powerful account. It is primarily a travel account, and Bashō vividly relates the unique poetic essence of each stop in his travels. Stops on his journey include the Tokugawa shrine at Nikkō, the Shirakawa barrier, the islands of Matsushima, Hiraizumi, Sakata, Kisakata, and Etchū. He and Sora parted at Yamanaka, but at Ōgaki he briefly met up with a few of his other disciples before departing again to the Ise Shrine and closing the account.

After his journey, he spent five years working and reworking the poems and prose of Oku no Hosomichi before publishing it. Based on differences between draft versions of the account, Sora's diary, and the final version, it is clear that Bashō took a number of artistic liberties in the writing. An example of this is that in the Senjūshu ("Selection of Tales") attributed to Saigyō, the narrator is passing through Eguchi when he is driven by a storm to seek shelter in the nearby cottage of a prostitute; this leads to an exchange of poems, after which he spends the night there. Bashō similarly includes in Oku no Hosomichi a tale of him having an exchange with prostitutes staying in the same inn, but Sora mentions nothing.

Philosophy behind the text

Nobuyuki Yuasa notes that Bashō studied Zen meditation under the guidance of the Priest Buccho, though it is uncertain whether Bashō ever attained enlightenment. The Japanese Zen scholar D. T. Suzuki has described Bashō's philosophy in writing poetry as one requiring that both "subject and object were entirely annihilated" in meditative experience. Yuasa likewise writes: "Bashō had been casting away his earthly attachments, one by one, in the years preceding the journey, and now he had nothing else to cast away but his own self which was in him as well as around him. He had to cast this self away, for otherwise he was not able to restore his true identity (what he calls the 'everlasting self which is poetry). Yuasa notes "The Narrow Road to the Deep North is Bashō's study in eternity, and in so far as he has succeeded in this attempt, it is also a monument he has set up against the flow of time."

References

Bibliography

English translations
 Bashō, Matsuo. The Narrow Road to the Deep North and Other Travel Sketches. Intro. and trans. Nobuyuki Yuasa. London: Penguin Books (Penguin Classics), 1966. Print. 
 Bashō, Matsuo. "The Narrow Road Through the Provinces". Japanese Poetic Diaries. Ed. and trans. Earl Miner. Berkeley: University of California Press, 1969. Print.
 Bashō, Matsuo. "The Narrow Road to the Interior". Classical Japanese Prose: An Anthology. Ed. and trans. Helen Craig McCullough. Stanford: Stanford University Press, 1990. Print.
 Bashō, Matsuo. Narrow Road to the Interior. Trans. Sam Hamill. Boston: Shambhala (Shambhala Centaur Editions), 1991. Print.  (Presentation)
 Reedition: Bashō, Matsuo. Narrow Road to the Interior and other writings. Trans. Sam Hamill. 2nd ed. Boston: Shambhala (Shambhala Classics), 2000. Print.  (Presentation)
 Bashō, Matsuo. Back Roads to Far Towns: Bashō's Oku-no-hosomichi. Trans. Cid Corman and Kamaike Susumu. 2nd ed. (1st ed. Grossman, 1968.) Hopewell: Ecco Press, 1996. Print. 
 Reedition: Bashō, Matsuo. Back Roads to Far Towns: Bashō's Travel Journal. Trans. Cid Corman and Kamaike Susumu. Buffalo: White Pine Press, 2004. Print.  (Preview on Google Books) (Review of the book at Modern Haiku)
 Bashō, Matsuo. Bashō's Narrow Road: Spring and Autumn Passages. Trans. Hiroaki Sato. Berkeley: Stone Bridge Press (The Rock Spring Collection of Japanese Literature), 1996a. Print. 
 Bashō, Matsuo. The Narrow Road to Oku. Trans. Donald Keene. Tokyo: Kodansha International, 1996b. Print. 
 An earlier and slightly different partial translation appeared in the same translator's 1955 Anthology of Japanese Literature.
 Bashō, Matsuo. A Haiku Journey: Bashō's Narrow Road to a Far Province. Trans. Dorothy Britton. 3rd ed. (1st ed. 1974.) Tokyo: Kodansha International, 2002. Print. 
 Chilcott, Tim. "Bashō: Oku no Hosomichi". Tim Chilcott LITERARY TRANSLATIONS. August 2004. Web. Consulted on 13 November 2010.

Critical works
 Keene, Donald. Seeds in the Heart: Japanese Literature from Earliest Times to the Late Sixteenth Century. New York: Columbia University Press, 1999. Print. 
 Keene, Donald. Travelers of a Hundred Ages. New York: Columbia University Press, 1999a. Print. 
 Norman, Howard. "On the Trail of a Ghost". National Geographic. February 2008, 136–149. Print.
 Online version: Norman, Howard. "On the Poet's Trail". National Geographic. February 2008. Web. Consulted on 13 November 2010.
 Shirane, Haruo. Traces of Dreams: Landscape, Cultural Memory, and the Poetry of Bashō. Stanford: Stanford University Press, 1998. Print.  (Preview on Google Books)
 Suzuki, Daisetz Teitaro. The Awakening of Zen. London: Shambhala, 1980. Print.

External links

 "Matsuo Bashô: Oku no Hosomichi", featuring 9 different translations of the opening paragraph
  Oku no Hosomichi road map from the Ishikawa Prefecture website
  Original Japanese text of Oku no Hosomichi
  Listen to Oku no hosomichi at librivox.org
 Manuscript scans: 1789, mid-Edo period, mid-Edo period from the Waseda University Library

1702 books
Books published posthumously
Edo-period works
Japanese poetry collections
Travel books
Articles containing Japanese poems
Haiku